Daniel B. Clark (April 28, 1890 – November 14, 1961) was an American cinematographer. He worked on around a hundred films and television series during his career. During the late 1920s he was president of the American Society of Cinematographers.

Selected filmography

 The Lone Star Ranger (1919)
 Catch My Smoke (1922)
 Tom Mix in Arabia (1922)
 Just Tony (1922)
 Up and Going (1922)
 Do and Dare (1922)
 The Fighting Streak (1922)
 Three Jumps Ahead (1923)
 The Lone Star Ranger (1923)
 North of Hudson Bay (1923)
 Stepping Fast (1923)
 The Heart Buster (1924)
 The Trouble Shooter (1924)
 Oh, You Tony! (1924)
 Dick Turpin (1925)
 Riders of the Purple Sage (1925)
 The Lucky Horseshoe (1925)
 The Best Bad Man (1925)
 My Own Pal (1926)
 Hard Boiled (1926)
 The Great K & A Train Robbery (1926)
 The Yankee Señor (1926)
 The Broncho Twister (1927)
 The Circus Ace (1927)
 Daredevil's Reward (1928)
 The Last of the Duanes (1930)
 Rough Romance (1930)
 Harmony at Home (1930)
 The Black Camel (1931)
 My Pal, the King (1932)
 Destry Rides Again (1932)
 Charlie Chan in Paris (1935)
 Charlie Chan in Egypt (1935)
 Back to Nature (1936)
 Educating Father (1936)
 Charlie Chan at the Circus (1936)
 Champagne Charlie (1936)
 Step Lively, Jeeves! (1937)
 Charlie Chan at the Olympics (1937)
 Charlie Chan at Monte Carlo (1937)
 Five of a Kind (1938)

References

Bibliography
 Tag Gallagher. John Ford: The Man and His Films. University of California Press, 1988.

External links

1890 births
1961 deaths
American cinematographers
Recipients of the Scientific and Technical Academy Award of Merit